Author & Punisher is a one-man band from San Diego, formed in January 2004 by mechanical engineer and artist Tristan Shone. Most of the instrumentation and controllers Shone uses, called "Drone Machines" and "Dub Machines", are custom-designed and fabricated by Shone from raw materials and open-source electronic circuitry.

Shone has released nine albums as Author & Punisher, with Melk en Honing (2015) and Pressure Mine (2017) released through Phil Anselmo's record label Housecore Records. His latest, Krüller, was released by Relapse Records on February 11, 2022.

Discography

Studio albums

EPs

Live albums

References

American doom metal musical groups
One-man bands
American industrial metal musical groups